Volodymyr Patyk (9 October 1926 – 28 August 2016) was a Ukrainian artist.

Biography
Patyk was born in the village of Chornyy Ostriv, in what is now Stryi Raion, Lviv Oblast, Ukraine in 1926. In 1953, he graduated from The Lviv National Academy of Arts (in R. Selsky). The artist worked in the field of  easel and monumental painting and graphics.

Patyk traveled almost the whole Ukraine, he was in the Carpathian Mountains, far to the north of Russia in Murmansk, he painted  in  the Baltic states, Siberia, Central Asia - and there the artist was  captured by the beauty of nature, people and their activities. Thus was produced his  own brushwork, his distinctive, spirited style. The artist proceeds to the contrast of red and green, orange and yellow and blue-violet, red and white, through a variety of means - mosaics, murals, most of all - to oil painting, pastels and various drawing tools. From the last time (since 1990)  the main formative role in his artistic style plays a pure color that enhances the activity of emotional pictures and highlights the decorative solution compositions.  Patyk is very close to Ukrainian icon and Tuscan primitives, Ravenna mosaics and Italian painters of  Protorenaissance.

Patyk was a People's Artist of Ukraine (1996) and a holder of a Shevchenko National Prize (1999).

Patyk died at the age of 89 on 28 August 2016.

References

External links
 Volodymyr Patyk

1929 births
2016 deaths
People from Lviv Oblast
People from Lwów Voivodeship
20th-century Ukrainian painters
20th-century Ukrainian male artists
21st-century Ukrainian painters
21st-century Ukrainian male artists
Recipients of the Shevchenko National Prize
Recipients of the title of People's Painter of Ukraine
Ukrainian male painters